Chung Kuo may refer to:

Chung Kuo (novel series), a science fiction novel series by David Wingrove
Chung Kuo, Cina, a 1972 film directed by Michelangelo Antonioni
"Chung Kuo", a song by Vangelis from the album China